Mambo No. Sex (titled Kiss Me in Japan) is a 1999 album by German Eurodance band E-Rotic. Its name is a play on the popular song "Mambo No. 5" by Lou Bega, which was released seven months before this album.

Track listing

Mambo No. Sex
 "Mambo No. Sex" (radio edit) – 3:03
 "Temple of Love" – 3:17
 "Give a Little Love" – 3:55
 "Don't Talk Dirty to Me" – 3:24
 "Oh Nick Please Not So Quick" – 3:20
 "Wild and Strong" – 4:18
 "Sam" – 3:26
 "Do It All Night" – 3:46
 "Dance with the Vamps" – 3:57
 "Dr. Love" – 3:14
 "Makin' Love in the Sun" – 3:56
 "Wish You Were Here" – 3:12
 "Oh Nick Please Not So Quick" (flute version) – 3:32
 "Mambo No. Sex" (extended version) – 4:59
 "Sam" (extended version) – 6:05

Kiss Me
 "Kiss Me" – 3:24
 "Temple of Love" – 3:17
 "Give a Little Love" – 3:55
 "Don't Talk Dirty to Me" – 3:24
 "Oh Nick Please Not So Quick" – 3:20
 "Wild and Strong" – 4:18
 "Sam" – 3:26
 "Do It All Night" – 3:46
 "Dance with the Vamps" – 3:57
 "Dr. Love" – 3:14
 "Makin' Love in the Sun" – 3:56
 "Wish You Were Here" – 3:12
 "Oh Nick Please Not So Quick" (flute version) – 3:32
 "Kiss Me" (extended version) – 6:24
 "Sam" (extended version) – 6:05

1999 albums
E-Rotic albums